Swansea is a town in Bristol County in southeastern Massachusetts.
The population was 17,144 at the 2020 census.

The villages of Hortonville, Barneyville and Ocean Grove are located in the town.

History

Swansea was named for the Welsh city of Swansea, which had been the hometown of some original settlers. John Miles, the founder of the first Baptist Church in Wales, moved to Swansea .  William Brenton had purchased the land from Native Americans. Parts of its territory were originally part of Rehoboth, Massachusetts.

In 1667 the first Baptist church in Massachusetts relocated to Swansea from Rehoboth after experiencing religious intolerance there, and Swansea was incorporated as an independent town.  Initially, the town established a committee to assign rank of 1, 2, or 3 to the residents with the first getting 3 acres of land, the second 2, and the third 1.  The committee could promote and demote residents as it saw fit.  The system collapsed in 1681 when the committee voted to make five residents the highest rank and to make the rank hereditary. The town unanimously voted to abolish the system.

On June 20, 1675, the first Indian attack of King Philip's War had all 70 settlers confined to their stockade.  The attack had taken place at the Miles Garrison, near the Palmer River. By June 25 the entire town had been burned, although a handful of the colonists escaped to Taunton.  When the active war ended in 1676, the town was soon rebuilt. The Miles (or Myles) Garrison stood the test of time, but was demolished in the 1970s. The plot it was on remains overgrown, free from construction, and a commemorative marker was placed there by the Commonwealth of Massachusetts in 1912.

After the war, many small industries, such as forges, ironworks and fisheries, opened up in the town.  Many would later leave, and there remains a large agricultural sector.

What is now Barrington, Rhode Island (part of Massachusetts until 1747) was separated from the rest of Swansea in 1717, over religious differences.

In the late 1890s, trolleys connected the town to Providence, Fall River and Taunton, and the town has retained a suburban residential feel. Today Swansea is well known for its retail areas.

Swansea gained national attention in 1985 when Mark Hoyle, a young hemophiliac who had contracted AIDS through a blood transfusion, was allowed to attend public schools by Jack McCarthy, Superintendent of Schools.  It was the first time in the U.S. that a student known to have the disease was allowed to enter public schools.  The case came to national attention around the same time as that of Ryan White in Indiana, and helped many children with HIV attend schools throughout the country.  Hoyle died one year later, and a new elementary school was named in his honor.

Geography
The town is bordered by Dighton on the northeast, Somerset on the east, Mount Hope Bay on the south, Warren, Rhode Island, on the southwest, Barrington, Rhode Island, on the west, and Seekonk and Rehoboth to the north. Part of the town's border with Somerset is made up of the Lees River. The Cole, Kickamuit and Palmer rivers also pass through the town on their way south to Mount Hope Bay (for the Kickamuit, Cole and Lees rivers) and Narragansett Bay (for the Palmer). The entire town is a part of the Narragansett Bay watershed area. The town's neighborhoods include Barneyville, North Swansea, Swansea Village, Birch Swamp Corner, Hortonville, Luther Corner, South Swansea, Touissett, Ocean Grove, and Smokerise.

Much of the town's retail businesses are located along the highways, with the area around the junction of U.S. Route 6 and Massachusetts Route 118 where the former Swansea Mall was located.  Just north of the mall are several office complexes, including the former headquarters of the First Federal Bank (now a division headquarters for Webster Bank, which bought it out), doctor's offices and Academic Management Services, a division of Sallie Mae.  The area along Route 103 between the Lees River and the Cole River is also an area for retail, with many smaller businesses lining the road.

Outside of the retail area (as well as the densely populated neighborhoods of Ocean Grove, South Swansea and Smokerise), much of the area is rural.

Demographics

As of the census of 2000, there were 15,901 people, 5,888 households, and 4,539 families residing in the town. The racial makeup of the town was 97.91% White, 0.38% African American, 0.08% Native American, 0.36% Asian, 0.01% Pacific Islander, 0.27% from other races, and 1.00% from two or more races. Hispanic or Latino of any race were 0.60% of the population.

There were 5,888 households, out of which 31.1% had children under the age of 18 living with them, 64.6% were married couples living together, 8.8% had a female householder with no husband present, and 22.9% were non-families. 19.6% of all households were made up of individuals, and 10.2% had someone living alone who was 65 years of age or older.  The average household size was 2.67 and the average family size was 3.06.

In the town, the population was spread out, with 22.2% under the age of 18, 6.7% from 18 to 24, 28.4% from 25 to 44, 27.0% from 45 to 64, and 15.7% who were 65 years of age or older.  The median age was 40 years. For every 100 females, there were 96.9 males.  For every 100 females age 18 and over, there were 92.3 males.

The median income for a household in the town was $52,524, and the median income for a family was $60,567. Males had a median income of $40,056 versus $27,072 for females. The per capita income for the town was $21,776.  About 3.4% of families and 4.9% of the population were below the poverty line, including 2.9% of those under age 18 and 11.0% of those age 65 or over.

Government

On the state level, Swansea is a part of two state representative districts, the Fourth Bristol (including Rehoboth, Seekonk and part of Norton, Rep. Steve Howitt) and Fifth Bristol (including Dighton, Somerset and part of the city of Taunton, Rep. Patricia Haddad).  The town is part of the First Bristol and Plymouth state senatorial district, which includes the communities of Fall River, Freetown, Lakeville, Rochester, Somerset and Westport, currently Senator Michael Rodrigues (D-Westport) represents Swansea.  Swansea is patrolled by Troop D (Southeast District), 3rd (Dartmouth) Barracks of the Massachusetts State Police.  On the national level, the town is part of Massachusetts's 4th congressional district, which is represented by Joseph Kennedy III.  The state's senior Senator is Elizabeth Warren  and the state's junior Senator is Edward Markey.

The town is governed by Selectmen and an Administrator.  Swansea also maintains the tradition of open Town Meetings.  As of 2001, total property values are assessed at $980 million, and property taxes amount to $15 million. The town operates on a budget of approximately $10 million, which does not include another $13.5 million spent on schools.

The town has four fire stations (the Central station being in South Swansea, with branch stations in North Swansea, Central Swansea and Ocean Grove), one library, a single police station, and a new post office.  The town has two playgrounds, as well as a town beach with a picnic area (near the mouth of the Cole), and the town conservation farm.

Education

Secondary
The Swansea Public Schools serve the town, with four elementary schools (Joseph G. Luther Elementary School at Luther's Corner, Gardner Elementary School in the South Swansea-Ocean Grove neighborhood, Elizabeth S. Brown Elementary School near the town center, and Mark Hoyle Elementary School in North Swansea), as well as Joseph Case Junior High School and Joseph Case High School, both located in the town center.  Case High School (as it is commonly known) has the school colors of maroon and gold, and its mascot is the Cardinal.  High school students also have the option of attending Diman Regional Vocational Technical High School in Fall River, or Bristol County Agricultural High School in Dighton.

There are two Christian schools in town, and there are also local Catholic schools in nearby Warren and Fall River.

Post-secondary
Eastern Nazarene College offers Adult Studies/LEAD classes in Swansea.

Transportation
The town is bisected by Interstate 195, U.S. Route 6, and state routes 103, 118 and 136. Swansea has two exits off I-195 serving the town, Exit 2 (Route 136) and 3 (Route 6 to Route 118).  In addition, Exit 4 (Route 103) in Somerset provides quick access to the Ocean Grove neighborhood.

Swansea is the western terminus of the Southeastern Regional Transit Authority (SRTA) bus line.  Regional bus service can be reached in Fall River, and the nearest regional rail service is in Providence.  The nearest national airline service can be reached at T. F. Green Airport in Rhode Island, and international service can be reached at Logan International Airport in Boston.

Points of interest

 Martin House Farm, 1728 G.A.R. Highway, North Swansea
 J.G. Luther Museum (home of the Swansea Historical Society), Old Warren Rd. (intersection of Maple Avenue and Pearse Road)
 Simcock House, 1074 Sharps Lot Road
 The Ice Cream Barn at Baker Farm, 89 Locust Street
 Holiday Inn Express & Suites, 1400 G.A.R. Highway
 Swansea Motor Inn (featuring water beds), 999 G.A.R. Highway
 Eskimo King Ice Cream Shop, 29 Market Street

Notable people

Antone S. Aguiar Jr., politician
Benjamin Brown, politician
Benjamin Carpenter, military officer
Oliver Chace, businessman
Warren A. Cole, lawyer
Mark Anthony DeWolf, merchant
Bob Evans, wrestler
Joshua K. Ingalls, inventor
David Leite, writer
John Myles, founder of Swansea
David J. Place, politician
Cheryl Wheeler, musician
Thomas Willett, politician

References

Further reading

 History of Swansea, Massachusetts, 1667–1917, by Otis Olney Wright

External links

Town of Swansea official website

 
Towns in Bristol County, Massachusetts
Populated places established in 1667
Eastern Nazarene College locations
1667 establishments in Massachusetts
Providence metropolitan area
Towns in Massachusetts
Populated coastal places in Massachusetts